An annular solar eclipse will occur on Tuesday, July 24, 2074. A solar eclipse occurs when the Moon passes between Earth and the Sun, thereby totally or partly obscuring the image of the Sun for a viewer on Earth. An annular solar eclipse occurs when the Moon's apparent diameter is smaller than the Sun's, blocking most of the Sun's light and causing the Sun to look like an annulus (ring). An annular eclipse appears as a partial eclipse over a region of the Earth thousands of kilometres wide.

Related eclipses

Solar eclipses 2073–2076

Saros 137 

It is a part of Saros cycle 137, repeating every 18 years, 11 days, containing 70 events. The series started with partial solar eclipse on May 25, 1389. It contains total eclipses from August 20, 1533, through December 6, 1695, first set of hybrid eclipses from December 17, 1713, through February 11, 1804, first set of annular eclipses from February 21, 1822, through March 25, 1876, second set of hybrid eclipses from April 6, 1894, through April 28, 1930, and second set of annular eclipses from May 9, 1948, through April 13, 2507. The series ends at member 70 as a partial eclipse on June 28, 2633. The longest duration of totality was 2 minutes, 55 seconds on September 10, 1569. Solar Saros 137 has 55 umbral eclipses from August 20, 1533, through April 13, 2507 (973.62 years). That's almost 1 millennium!

References

External links 

2074 7 24
2074 in science
2074 7 24
2074 7 24